Henry Edward Kerr (28 January 1879 – 17 May 1951) was a New Zealand athlete who competed mainly in walking events. He competed for Australasia in the 1908 Summer Olympics held in London in the 3500 metre walk where he won the bronze medal. This was the first time a New Zealand-born person had won an Olympic medal.

Biography 

Kerr was born in Taranaki and was a champion shooter and keen rugby player, as well as competing in a variety of track and field events. Competing for a time as a professional he was required to stand down from competition for two years in order to regain his amateur status. After winning numerous national titles Kerr virtually retired in 1912 and briefly served in World War I in mid-1918, but returned to win two more national titles in 1925 at the age of 46.

Kerr was inducted into the New Zealand Sports Hall of Fame in 1996.

On 13 July 2008 to commemorate the first Olympic Games medal by a New Zealander (actually on 14 July 1908) the Harry Kerr Centennial Walking Relay was held at Sovereign Stadium, Mairangi Bay, Auckland. Two events were held, a 5×10 km relay and a 3500 m individual event. A shield for the winning team was presented by Kerr's daughter-in-law. It is proposed that this will be an annual event.

Kerr's great-grandson is New Zealand film director and rugby union player Winston Cowie.

References

External links 
 
 Biography at New Zealand Olympic Committee website
 Harry Kerr Centennial Relay on Racewalking Auckland website

1879 births
1951 deaths
New Zealand male racewalkers
Olympic bronze medalists for Australasia
Athletes (track and field) at the 1908 Summer Olympics
Olympic athletes of Australasia
Deaths from cancer in New Zealand
People from Inglewood, New Zealand
Medalists at the 1908 Summer Olympics
Olympic bronze medalists in athletics (track and field)
New Zealand military personnel of World War I